A list of films produced in Argentina in 2002:

See also
2002 in Argentina

External links and references
 Argentine films of 2002 at the Internet Movie Database

2002
Films
Argentine